Nataša Lovrić (born 2 October 2000) is a Serbian handball player for ŽORK Jagodina and the Serbian national team.

She represented Serbia at the 2021 World Women's Handball Championship.

References

External links

Serbian female handball players
2000 births
Living people
People from Novi Sad
Expatriate handball players